William or Willie Waddell may refer to:

Willie Waddell (1921–1979), Scottish footballer and manager for Rangers F.C.
Willie Waddell (footballer, born 1919) (1919–1979), less well known Scottish footballer, played for Aberdeen and Kettering Town
William B. Waddell (Pony Express founder) (1807–1872), founder, owner, and operator of the Pony Express
William B. Waddell (Manitoba politician) (1857—1942), Canadian politician
William Gillan Waddell (1884–1945), classical scholar and translator